Surajmal Saha (1918-1971) was an Indian politician. He was a Member of Parliament, representing Odisha in the Rajya Sabha the upper house of India's Parliament as a member of the Jana Congress.

References

Rajya Sabha members from Odisha
1918 births
1971 deaths